Rita Gam (born Rita Eleanore MacKay, April 2, 1927March 22, 2016) was an American film and television actress and documentary filmmaker. She won the Silver Bear for Best Actress.

Background
Gam was born in Pittsburgh, Pennsylvania, the daughter of Belle (née Fately), who was born in Romania, and Milton A. MacKay, who was born in France to parents from Romania. Her father died in New York in 1931 and her mother remarried. Gam took the surname of her stepfather, Benjamin J. Gam.

Career
Gam was a model before she ventured into acting. Her acting career began on Broadway and in television, after which she moved on to films. Her Broadway credits included There's a Girl in My Soup, The Insect Comedy, A Flag is Born, and A Temporary Island.

She appeared first in the 1952 film noir The Thief, which starred Ray Milland. In October 1952, she signed a long-term MGM contract. Another notable role was Herodias in 1961's King of Kings.

Gam was an occasional panelist on the famous live broadcast CBS game show What's My Line as well in the 1950s and early 1960s.

She shared the Silver Bear for Best Actress award with Viveca Lindfors at the 1962 Berlin Film Festival, for their performances in Tad Danielewski's No Exit.

In 1963, Gam was a leading member of The Minnesota Theatre Company in the opening season of The Tyrone Guthrie Theater in Minneapolis. Gam appeared in a few more American films before working in Europe. She returned to the U.S. to appear in small parts in films, including Klute in 1971, before taking up documentary film making.

In 2003, she appeared in the rotating cast of the Off-Broadway stage reading of Wit & Wisdom. In 2004, she appeared in one of a series of ads for the Royal Bank of Scotland.

Personal life and death
Gam's first husband was director Sidney Lumet, whom she married in 1949. The marriage ended in divorce in 1955.

In 1956, Gam was a bridesmaid at the wedding of Grace Kelly to Prince Rainier in Monaco. Gam’s 1956 marriage to publisher Thomas Guinzburg ended in divorce in 1963.

Gam died on March 22, 2016, at Cedars-Sinai Medical Center in Los Angeles, California, from respiratory failure.

Books
Gam was the author of two books, Actress to Actress and Actors: A Celebration.

Filmography

Film

Television

References

External links

 
 
 
 
 Rita Gam at the University of Wisconsin's Actors Studio audio collection

1927 births
2016 deaths
Actresses from Pittsburgh
American documentary film directors
American film actresses
American people of French-Jewish descent
American people of Romanian-Jewish descent
American television actresses
American stage actresses
Jewish American actresses
Metro-Goldwyn-Mayer contract players
Ethical Culture Fieldston School alumni
Silver Bear for Best Actress winners
20th-century American actresses
Film directors from New York City
American women documentary filmmakers
Lumet family